Phragmipedium pearcei is a species of orchid ranging from Ecuador to northern Peru.

References

External links 

pearcei
Orchids of Ecuador
Orchids of Peru
Terrestrial orchids